James Wilbur Smith Jr. (born October 28, 1943) is an American judge who joined the Supreme Court of Mississippi in January 1993 and served as chief justice from March 2004 until 2008.

Prior to running for a seat on the state supreme court, Smith had worked on the Mississippi Youth Court, and chaired the state Council of Youth Court Judges from 1991 to 1992.

References

1943 births
Living people
Chief Justices of the Mississippi Supreme Court